The J Award of 2006 is the second annual J Awards, established by the Australian Broadcasting Corporation's youth-focused radio station Triple J. The announcement comes at the culmination of Ausmusic Month (November).
For the second and final year, there was only one category, Australian Album of the Year.

Who's eligible? 
Any Australian album released independently or through a record company, or sent to Triple J in consideration for airplay, is eligible for the J Award. The 2006 nominations were selected from albums received by triple j between December 2005 and November 2006.

The criteria 
The J Award is for an album of outstanding achievement as an Australian musical work of art - for its creativity, innovation, musicianship and contribution to Australian music. Fifteen nominations were announced throughout the year.

Award
Australian Album of the Year

References

2006 in Australian music
2006 music awards
J Awards